The Bryan White Foundation  is a private foundation founded by Kirumira Brian  a motivational speaker commonly known as Bryan White. The foundation started  in 2015 and was launched in Mbarara 2018. It is a non-profit organization with the aim of creating  breakthrough solutions spanning financial, agricultural, sports and health services.

History 
Bryan White Foundation started in 2015, founded by one of the biggest Charitable, inspirational and motivational speakers in Uganda, Kirumira Brian commonly known as Bryan White. He started it with staff of ten that includes influential icons in the Ugandan society like Radio & Weasel, Dr Jose Chameleon , Big Eye, King Michael, Maria Tinatinde, Cindy and comedians like Comedy Store Uganda's director Alex Muhangi, Madrat and Chiko. The aim is to empower, motivate and awaken the Youth from poverty in Uganda through doing activation like Charity, Donations and sponsorship of creative youths. It was also launched in one of the biggest city, Mbarara in 2018

Activities 
Among activities that are being done by Bryan foundation are doing charity work and donations in hospitals on mental mothers, disabled mothers and children, helping poor pregnant mothers in the hospital by providing basic equipment needed. The foundation also focuses on paying school fees for orphans and street kids thus taking them back to school for a better future.

References

External links 
 
 

Non-profit organizations based in Africa